The Frauen DFB-Pokal 1981–82 was the second season of the cup competition, Germany's second-most important title in women's football. In the final which was held in Frankfurt on 1 May 1982 SSG Bergisch Gladbach defeated VfL Wittekind Wildeshausen 3–0, thus claiming their second cup title.

Participants

First round

Replay

Quarter-finals

Semi-finals

Final

See also 

 1981–82 DFB-Pokal men's competition

References 

Fra
DFB-Pokal Frauen seasons